Kenneth Chawngliana is a Zoram People's Movement politician from Mizoram. He was the fourth Speaker of Mizoram Legislative Assembly. He had been elected in Mizoram Legislative Assembly elected 1979 to 1984  from Saitual as candidate of Mizo People's Conference.

Career
He was the founder Principal of Hrangbana College from 21 July 1980 to 31 March 1982 and Government Kolasib College from 1 July 1978 to 10 January 1981. He was speaker of Mizoram Legislative Assembly from 25 May 1979 to 8 May 1984. He left the Mizoram People's Conference party in 2016 and joined the Zoram Nationalist Party. He is at present the Vice president of Zoram People's Movement. He has also served as a member of the Mizoram public Service commission.

Education
He has completed his  Ph.D from Gokhale Institute of Politics and Economics, Savitribai Phule Pune University in 1979.

Books
He has written two books:
 Ralluaii Mizo Tawng Chikna
 Nupa Hlimn a Thuruk

References 

Living people
People from Aizawl
Speakers of the Mizoram Legislative Assembly
1946 births
Mizo people